Dielitzia is a genus of flowering plants in the family Asteraceae described as a genus in 1989 by Philip Sydney Short.

There is only one known species, Dielitzia tysonii, endemic to Western Australia.

References

Gnaphalieae
Monotypic Asteraceae genera
Flora of Western Australia
Taxa named by Philip Sydney Short